The Strongest Man in the World is a 1975 American science fiction comedy film directed by Vincent McEveety, produced by Walt Disney Productions, and starring Kurt Russell, Joe Flynn and Eve Arden. It is the second sequel to the 1969 film The Computer Wore Tennis Shoes, after Now You See Him, Now You Don't (1972).

Flynn died by drowning in July 1974 after principal shooting had completed, and the film was released six months after his death.

Plot
Medfield College's Dean Higgins (Joe Flynn) is about to be fired for financial mismanagement due to extreme overspending by Prof. Quigley's (William Schallert) science class. Higgins finds out the high costs are for renting a cow as a test subject; they are feeding it various concoctions to make it fatter. In a rage, Higgins fires Quigley then threatens to have his entire class thrown out of college. When the dean slams the door as he leaves, Dexter Riley's (Kurt Russell) chemical experiment mixes with that of another student, Richard Schuyler's (Michael McGreevey) vitamin cereal mix.

When the cow eats some of the cereal into which the mixture has leaked, the students learn that the cereal gave the cow the ability to produce a huge supply of milk, over 80 gallons. When Dexter eats it the next morning he gains super-strength, as does the fraternity house's pet dog.

Dexter shows the dean and Quigley his super-strength by picking up an obese kid in a chair with the right hand and Schuyler with the left. Higgins jumps on this as an opportunity to get Medfield out of its financial slump and keep the Board of Regents from firing him. Higgins takes the formula-laced cereal to the board of the Crumply Crunch cereal company and demonstrates its effects to the board and its president, Aunt Harriet Crumply (Eve Arden). They decide to advertise the powers of the formula-laced cereal by challenging Krinkle Krunch, a rival cereal company run by Mr. Kirwood Krinkle (Phil Silvers), to a competition between their sponsored weight-lifting team and Medfield's to see which cereal can give the other greater strength. Krinkle sponsors the well-funded State College.

Krinkle has a mole named Harry (Dick Van Patten) on the inside who tells the Krinkle president about the formula. Hearing this, he hires A. J. Arno (Cesar Romero) and some of his goons, just released from prison, to steal it. They break in, but are almost caught before they can get it. They then kidnap Schuyler (as no one knows that Dexter's chemical was the vital ingredient of the formula, rather than Schuyler's vitamins). They take him to Chinatown where they use Chinese torture and hypnotism to get the formula. They then hypnotize him to return home and not tell what happened to him. This accidentally causes him to steal a police car, leading to a car chase which gets him thrown in jail. Fortunately, without Dexter's chemical added in, the formula Krinkle Krunch has in the cereal does not give super-strength; when Krinkle tries it, he ends up breaking his hand. While he berates the mole on the phone, the mole realizes that if they do not know that the formula does not work, then Medfield does not know either and will lose the weight-lifting competition.

On the day of the competition, Dexter realizes it was his formula that gave the cereal super-strength; he sets off to the lab to get it, taking the Dean's beautiful but slow vintage car. When he finally gets there, he is confronted by Arno and 10 of his goons. By drinking some of the formula, Dexter is able to beat up all the men, then uses Harry to strike Arno and his men down like bowling pins. He hears on the radio that he must return to the contest in four minutes or forfeit. He adds some formula to the car's fuel tank, which makes it race off at high speed, shedding parts as it goes. He makes it in time to compete last, but the car is a complete wreck, to the Dean's horror.

Medfield is losing badly, but Dexter uses the last of his super-strength to lift the 1,111 pound weight and win it for Crumply Crunch and Medfield. Higgins and Quigley get to keep their jobs, Arno is imprisoned yet again and the scheming Krinkle breaks his hand again after eating the wrong cereal.

Cast
 Kurt Russell as Dexter Riley
 Joe Flynn as Dean Higgins
 Eve Arden as Aunt Harriet Crumply
 Cesar Romero as A. J. Arno
 Phil Silvers as Mr. Kirwood Krinkle
 Dick Van Patten as Harry
 Harold Gould as Regent Dietz
 Michael McGreevey as Richard Schuyler
 Richard Bakalyan as Cookie
 William Schallert as Quigley
 Benson Fong as Ah Fong
 James Gregory as Chief Blair
 Ann Marshall as Debbie
 Don Carter as Gilbert
 Christina Anderson as Cris
 Paul Linke as Peter "Porky" Peterson
 Jack David Walker as Slither Roth 
 Melissa Caffey as Melissa
 John Debney as John 
 Derrel Maury as Hector 
 Matthew Conway Dunn as Matthew
 Pat Fitzpatrick as Pat 
 David R. Ellis as David 
 Larry Franco as Larry
 Roy Roberts as Mr. Roberts
 Fritz Feld as Uncle Frederick 
 Ronnie Schell as Referee
 Raymond Bailey as Regent Burns
 John Myhers as Mr. Roscoe
 James Brodhead as Cousin Edward
 Dick Patterson as Mr. Secretary
 Irwin Charone as Irwin
 Roger Price as Roger
 Jack Bailey as Jack
 Larry Gelman as Larry
 Eric Brotherson as Eric
 Jonathan Daly as TV Announcer
 Kathleen Freeman as Officer Hurley
 Iggie Wolfington as Mr. Becker
 Ned Wertimer as Mr. Parsons
 Milton Frome as Mr. Lufkin
 Laurie Main as Mr. Reedy
 Mary Treen as Mercedes
 Eddie Quillan as Mr. Willoughby
 Jeff DeBenning as Mr. Rogers
 Henry Slate as Mr. Slate
 Byron Webster as Mr. Webster
 Burt Mustin as Regent Appleby
 Arthur Space as Regent Shaw
 Bill Zuckert as Policeman
 Larry J. Blake as Pete
 William Bakewell as Professor
 Art Metrano as TV Color Man
 Peter Renaday as Reporter
 Lennie Weinrib as State Coach
 Danny Wells as Drummer
 James Beach as TV Man

Reception
Vincent Canby of The New York Times described it as "a Walt Disney comedy based on the old magic-formula story that's served the company well through thick (The Absent-Minded Professor) and thin (The Computer Wore Tennis Shoes). The new film, which opened at theaters throughout the city yesterday, is nowhere near as funny as the first but a lot better than the second". Stuart Oldham of Variety remarked that "the students of Medfield College unintentionally zap the laws of nature with unexpected and sometimes hilarious results".

On Metacritic the film has a score of 63% based on reviews from 4 critics, indicating "generally favorable reviews".

See also
 Dexter Riley (film series)
 List of American films of 1975

References

External links
  
 
 
 
 

1975 films
1970s children's comedy films
American children's comedy films
American science fiction comedy films
American sequel films
1970s science fiction comedy films
1970s English-language films
Films about hypnosis
Films directed by Vincent McEveety
Medfield College films
Walt Disney Pictures films
1975 comedy films
1970s American films